Moozhiyar Dam is a small dam located close to Kaki Reservoir in Ranni Forest, Seethathodu Grama Panchayath, Pathanamthitta District, Kerala. The Kakkad Hydroelectric Project is powered by water from the dam. The water level is set at 192.5 meters. KSEB is responsible for the maintenance of the dam and other ancillary works. The Kakkad Hydroelectric Project generates 50 MW of electricity using 2 turbines of 25 MW each year. The annual output is 262 MU. The machine was commissioned on 16 September 1999. Kakkad Hydro electric Project is the second stage development of Pamba river basin. The installed capacity is 50 MW (2 x 25MW). This scheme utilises the tail race water from Sabarigiri power station and flow received from Moozhiyar and Velluthode rivers. Two dams feed water to the powerhouse. The Moozhiyar Dam creates the main reservoir of this project. Taluks through which release flow are Ranni, Konni, Kozhencherry, Thiruvalla, Chengannur, Kuttanadu, Mavelikara and Karthikappally.

Specifications
Latitude:9⁰18’30”N
Longitude:77⁰00’04”E
Panchayath : Seethathodu
Village :Seethathodu
District : Pathanamthitta
River Basin :Pamba 
River: Kakkad ar
Release from Dam to river : Kakkad Ar
Year of completion : 1999
Type of Dam : Concrete – Gravity
 Classification: HH- ( High Height)
 Maximum Water Level (MWL) : EL 192.94 m
 Full Reservoir Level ( FRL) : EL 192.63 m
 Storage at FRL : 1.50 Mm3
 Height from deepest foundation : 30.04 m
 Length : 176.5 m
Spillway : 3 Nos. radial gates, each of size 7.62×6.70 m

Reservoir
Size of the Water Spread Area is 0.1457 km2 and the Full Reservoir Level (FRL) is at 192.63 m. Minimum Drawdown level (MDDL) is 181.36 m and Effective Storage at FRL is at 1.16 MCM Sabari giri Power Station commissioned during 1966 -67 with six generators having vertical shaft pelton turbine as the prime mover. After power generation, water from the power station is released to the Moozhiyar reservoir

References

Periyar (river)
Dams in Kerala